Wilhelm Johann Burgard (14 March 1927 – 23 October 2000) was a German athlete. He competed in the men's triple jump at the 1952 Summer Olympics, representing Saar.

References

External links
 

1927 births
2000 deaths
Athletes (track and field) at the 1952 Summer Olympics
German male triple jumpers
Olympic athletes of Saar
Sportspeople from Neunkirchen, Saarland
Saar athletes